15092 Beegees, provisional designation , is a stony Eoan asteroid from the outer regions of the asteroid belt, approximately  in diameter. It was discovered on 15 March 1999, by Australian amateur astronomer John Broughton at his Reedy Creek Observatory in Queensland, Australia. The S-type asteroid was named for the brothers of the Gibb family, known as the musical trio Bee Gees.

Orbit and classification 

Beegees is a core member the Eos family, the largest stony asteroid family in the outer main belt, consisting of nearly 10,000 known asteroids.

It orbits the Sun at a distance of 2.9–3.1 AU once every 5 years and 3 months (1,908 days; semi-major axis of 3.01 AU). Its orbit has an eccentricity of 0.03 and an inclination of 10° with respect to the ecliptic.

Physical characteristics 

In the SDSS-based taxonomy, Beegees is a common, stony S-type asteroid, which is also the overall spectral type for members of the Eos family. The asteroid has an absolute magnitude of 12.1. As of 2018, no rotational lightcurve has been obtained from photometric observations. The body's rotation period, pole and shape remain unknown.

Diameter and albedo 

According to the survey carried out by the NEOWISE mission of NASA's Wide-field Infrared Survey Explorer, Beegees measures 12.012 kilometers in diameter and its surface has an albedo of 0.122.

Naming 

This minor planet was named for the members the British pop-rock-disco group Bee Gees: Barry Gibb (born 1946), Robin Gibb (1949–2012), and Maurice Gibb (1949–2003), as well as for their younger brother and solo singer, Andy Gibb (1958–1988), who was never a member of the group. The renowned musicians were raised in Australia, only 100 kilometers from the Reedy Creek Observatory where this asteroid was discovered. The official naming citation was published by the Minor Planet Center on 9 May 2001.

References

External links 
 Dictionary of Minor Planet Names, Google books
 Discovery Circumstances: Numbered Minor Planets (15001)-(20000) – Minor Planet Center
 
 

015092
Discoveries by John Broughton
Named minor planets
19990315